The 2008–09 Magyar Kupa was the sixty-ninth season of Hungary's annual knock-out cup competition. It started with the first games of Round 1 on 2 August 2008 and ended with the Final held on 26 May 2009. The winners earned a place in the third qualifying round of the UEFA Europa League. Debreceni VSC were the defending champions.

Round 1
Games were played between 2 and 13 August 2008.

Round 2
Games were played between 19 and 28 August 2008.

Bye: Erzsébeti Spartacus MTK LE

Round 3
Games were played between 2 and 4 September 2008.

|}

Round 4
Games were played between 17 and 25 September 2008.

|}

Round 5
The first legs were played between 8 and 10 October 2008. The second legs were played on 21 and 22 October 2008.

|}

Quarterfinals
The first legs were played on 10 and 11 March 2009 and the second legs were played on 17 and 18 March 2009.

|}

Semifinals
The first legs were played on 14 and 15 April 2009 and the second legs were played on 21 and 22 April 2009.

|}

Final

Budapest Honvéd won 1–0 on aggregate

External links
 Official site 
 vikingkaos.hu, fan club of NB III team Tuszér SE; page also contains a huge statistical section 
 soccerway.com

Magyar Kupa
2008–09 domestic association football cups
2008-09